Aiding and Abetting is a novel by Muriel Spark published in 2000, six years before her death. Unlike her other novels, it is based partly on a documented occurrence; however, as the author states in a note, she takes liberties with the facts.

Plot summary

The central figure, Hildegarde Wolf, is a fraudulent psychiatrist, née Beate Pappenheim, working in Paris. She has two patients, each of whom claims to be Lord Lucan, an English earl who, in an actual event in London in 1974, killed his daughter's nanny, mistaking her for his wife. From this premise, the novel proceeds to present a series of humorous coincidences and improbabilities, revolving around the two 'Lucans' blackmailing Dr Wolf. The fatal confusion of 'Nanny and Wife' is mirrored chiasmatically in the fate of the two Lucans. The late chapters in Africa recall A Handful of Dust (1934) by Spark's model and sometime mentor Evelyn Waugh.

Reception

John Updike in The New Yorker described the novel as "one of the best of her sui-generis novels". Alex Clark in The Guardian called it "ambitious, rewardingly complex ... [an] exceptionally intelligent book. It is hard to think of another writer who could devise such a brashly absurd plot and then execute it with both flair and gravity". The Independent described it as "Part Buchanesque romp through the Scottish glens, part chilling psycho-drama". Kirkus Reviews said "Quick, incisive, often entertaining, sometimes mysterious, at a moment or two compelling, but overall and generally, slight. Yet, from this venerable author, even slight is still Sparkian".

References

External links
The Complete Review

2000 British novels
Novels by Muriel Spark
Novels based on actual events
Novels set in Paris
Viking Press books